Jane Fara Fauzzier Afia Boafowaa Yahaya Awindor (born April 10, 1987), better known by her stage name Efya, is a Ghanaian singer, songwriter, and actress from Kumasi. She is the daughter of Nana Adwoa Awindor, a filmmaker and celebrity host of the late television show Greetings From Abroad. Efya got her first exposure to fame when she participated in the maiden edition of the Stars of the Future talent show. She won Best Female Vocal Performance at the Ghana Music Awards in four succession, beginning in 2011. Moreover, she was applauded for her performance at the 2013 Africa Magic Viewers Choice Awards.

Her debut mixtape T.I.N.T was released on November 11, 2013. It contains songs that were released between 2011 and 2013. The mixtape was supported by two singles: "Getaway" and "Best In Me". She released her long-awaited debut studio album Janesis on April 22, 2016. It was previously scheduled for release at different times between 2013 and 2015. On January 11, 2014, Efya released "Forgetting Me" as the album's lead single. On May 8, 2016, she was announced as one of the newly signed acts to Wizkid's Starboy Entertainment. The announcement came following Wizkid's performance at the Ghana Music Awards. In March 2021, 3Music Network included Efya on its list of the Top 30 Most Influential Women in Music.

Life and music career

1987–2008: Early life, career beginnings, and Unveiled 
Jane Fara Fauzzier Afia Boafowaa Yahaya Awindor was born on April 10, 1987, in Kumasi, Ghana. She has two brothers and a sister. Efya obtained her secondary education from Yaa Asantewaa Secondary School. She relocated to Accra when her mother enrolled at the National Film and Television Institute. Efya received voice training from some of her family members at a very young age. She graduated with a degree in theatre and music from the University of Ghana. In 2008, she gained national acceptance throughout Ghana by becoming the first runner up in Charterhouse's Stars of The Future television show. She lost to Irene Logan, but secured herself a three-year recording deal. The deal enabled her and Irene to do a collaborative album titled Unveiled, which was released in South Africa. Following the conclusion of her recording deal with Charterhouse, Efya continued to record songs and perform at local gigs. She changed her stage name from Miss Jane to Efya prior to going solo. In an interview posted on the Modern Ghana website, Efya said, "When I decided to go solo, it made sense at the time to reinvent myself in every way, I wanted a name that was African and unique but at the same time relevant to me in some way. My manager, Jimmi, helped me come up with the name Efya".

2011–present: T.I.N.T., Janesis, clothing line and other releases

In 2011, Efya signed a recording deal with One Nation Entertainment. Her debut mixtape T.I.N.T was released on November 12, 2013. An acronym for This Is Not The Album, the mixtape comprises 13 tracks and was released for free digital download. It was supported by the singles "Getaway" and "Best in Me". T.I.N.T is composed of songs that were released between 2011 and 2013. In the aforementioned interview with ARISE, Efya said love is the overall theme of the mixtape and that the record is about "the good, the bad, the ugly, the heartbreak, the pains, the highs, and lows of life". The mixtape's lead single "Getaway" was released on November 10, 2011. The music video for the song was shot and directed in Accra by Sony Addo. The mixtape's second single "Best in Me" was released on February 14, 2012. Directed by OJ of Big OJ Films, the music video for "Best in Me" was uploaded to YouTube in September 2013. On February 14, 2013, Efya released "Body", a cover of Chris Brown's single "Don't Judge Me".

Efya released her debut studio album Janesis on April 22, 2016. It was initially slated for release in the third quarter of 2013. However, the release timeframe was postponed. The album's lead single "Forgetting Me" was released on January 11, 2014. The music video for the song was directed by Prince Dovlo of Seven Streets Entertainment. A writer for Modern Ghana described "Forgetting Me" as a "powerful ballad that tells the story of love and heartbreak". In an interview with Alexis Stephens of MTV Iggy in 2013, Efya said the album contains numerous love songs and explores the universal topics of hate and pain. She also said the album draws from her personal experiences. The Bisa Kdei-assisted track "One of Your Own" was released on July 16, 2014, as the album's second single. Efya initially wanted to release "Gingam Too Much" as the second single but after discussions with her team, she decided to postpone its release. The Kaywa-produced track "Gingam Too Much" was eventually released on December 26, 2014, as the album's third single. 

On December 23, 2016, Nigerian musician Wizkid released the single "Daddy Yo", with unaccredited vocals by Efya. However, Efya makes an appearance in the music video. On June 10, 2017, Efya released the reggae-infused track "Until the Dawn". It was produced by British-born Nigerian record producer and recording artist Maleek Berry.

Efya launched the clothing line The Native Chic in December 2019. She collaborated with Tiwa Savage on her single "The One".

Notable performances

On April 9, 2011, Efya performed at the 2011 MTN Ghana Music Awards, which occurred at the Dome in Accra. In October 2012, she performed at the Radio and Television Personality Awards, alongside Kojo Antwi, Asem, Ruff & Smooth, D3, No Tribe and Stonebwoy. In April 2013, Efya performed at the Carnivore Restaurant in Nairobi, Kenya; the event was organized by Capital 98.4 FM and sponsored by Tusker Brewery. Efya performed at Richie Mensah's "This is Love Concert" held on February 14, 2013, at the African Regent Hotel in Accra. She performed her single "Your Body", which was released on the same day. She also performed the remix of her "Best in Me" song with Richie Mensah.

On March 5, 2013, Efya performed alongside Samini, D-Black, Sherifa Gunu and R2Bees at the Hope City Launch Celebration Concert, headlined by American recording artist Chris Brown. On September 22, 2013, she graced the stage at the post-African Day Parade concert held at the Marcus Garvey Park in Harlem. On Saturday, November 9, 2013, Efya performed alongside P-Square, MI, Wande Coal, Burna Boy, Edem, Kwabena Kwabena, Asem and Paapa Yankson at the Glo "Slide N Bounce" concert series, which kicked off in Kumasi. On December 20, 2013, Efya performed at the 2013 edition of the annual Girl Talk concert, held at the National Theatre in Accra and headlined by Becca.

Artistry and musical influences
In an interview with Danai Mavunga of ARISE magazine, Efya described her sound as Afro-soul with a hint of pop. She said her sound fluctuates depending on how she feels and who she's working with. In another interview posted on the Modern Ghana website, Efya cited Kojo Antwi, Aretha Franklin and The Temptations as her key musical influences. Moreover, she said she was into old school jazz and highlife growing up.

Humanitarian work
Efya is an official ambassador for the Awal Children of the Future Foundation (ACOTF), a non-profit organization aimed at helping victims of physical and emotional trauma, particularly orphans and street kids. The foundation was founded by Posigee, a Tema-based record producer. The foundation consists of eight musical ambassadors, including Sarkodie, Ruff n Smooth and Yaw Siki. The foundation released its theme song "This is Who I Am" in 2012; the song was written by Chase and produced by Posigee. All of the proceeds from the digital sale of the song goes to the foundation.

Discography

Studio albums and mixtapes
 Unveiled (2009) (with Irene Logan)
 T.I.N.T (2013)
 Janesis (2015)

Filmography
 Single and Married (2012)

Awards and nominations

References

External links

Living people
1987 births
People from Kumasi
Neo soul singers
University of Ghana alumni
21st-century Ghanaian women singers
21st-century Ghanaian singers
Yaa Asantewaa Girls' Senior High School alumni